Dedrick Epps (born June 19, 1988) is a former American football tight end. He was selected by the San Diego Chargers in the seventh round, 253rd overall in the 2010 NFL Draft. He played college football for the University of Miami.

He was also a member of the Miami Dolphins, Indianapolis Colts, Chicago Bears, and New York Jets.

Early years
Epps attended Huguenot High School in Richmond, Virginia. As a senior in 2005, he caught 38 passes for more than 700 yards and eight touchdowns. He also had four two-point conversions. As a junior in 2004, he caught 15 passes for 233 yards and three touchdowns. On defense as an outside linebacker, he recorded 75 tackles and made three interceptions, one which he returned for a 75-yard touchdown. Rated the No. 12 tight end by Rivals.com, Epps accepted a football scholarship from the University of Miami.

College career
Epps played for the Miami Hurricanes for four seasons and was a starter in his junior and senior seasons. His best season came as a junior, where he caught 22 passes for 304 yards and 2 touchdowns, while starting 10 games. He ended his college career with 49 receptions, 634 receiving yards, and 6 touchdowns.

Professional career

San Diego Chargers
Epps was drafted by the Chargers in the seventh round, 235th overall in the 2010 NFL Draft.

Miami Dolphins
On September 14, 2010, Epps was signed to the Miami Dolphins practice squad. He was later waived on September 2, 2011.

Indianapolis Colts
Epps was signed to the Indianapolis Colts' practice squad on October 5, 2011. He was released on December 1, 2011.

New York Jets
Epps was signed to the New York Jets' practice squad on December 20, 2011. Epps was released by the Jets on September 1, 2012.

Chicago Bears
Epps was signed to the Chicago Bears' practice squad on September 10, 2012.

Second Stint with the New York Jets
Epps returned to the New York Jets' and was signed to the active roster from the Bears' practice squad on September 14, 2012. Epps was waived/injured on October 1, 2012.

References

External links
Miami Hurricanes bio

1988 births
Living people
American football tight ends
Indianapolis Colts players
Miami Dolphins players
Miami Hurricanes football players
New York Jets players
Players of American football from Richmond, Virginia
San Diego Chargers players